Zumu or Zumo may refer to:
Bata language
Jimi language (Cameroon),
Jimi language (Nigeria),
all Chadic. It is the last which is generally considered a separate language.